Allentown, New York may refer to:

Allentown, Buffalo, New York, a neighborhood in the city of Buffalo in Erie County, New York
Allentown, a hamlet in the town of Alma, New York in Allegany County
Allentown, a hamlet in the town of Day, New York in Saratoga County